Elections to city, county and district people's assemblies((시 ( 구역 ) · 군 인민회의 선거) were held in North Korea on November 15, 1987.

26,539 city, county and district people's assembly deputies were elected.

Voter turnout was reported as 100%, with candidates receiving a 100% approval rate.

References

1987 in North Korea
North Korea
Local elections in North Korea
November 1987 events in Asia